La seconda volta non si scorda mai (The Second Time Is Never Forgotten) is a 2008 Italian romantic comedy film directed  by Francesco Ranieri Martinotti and starring Alessandro Siani and Elisabetta Canalis. The theme song, "O munn va", by Pino Daniele, was nominated for a Nastro d'Argento award for Best Original Song.

Synopsis
Young Giulio is a successful real estate agent. One day, he discovers that the girlfriend of one of his clients is Ilaria, a girl that Giulio loved at school. Inside Giulio, the old flame is rekindled; however, Ilaria is about to marry a man much older than her. When she sends Giulio an email, asking him to meet, he discovers that the passion is mutual and the two become lovers. The emotional response of Giulio's parents, combined with the fact that Ilaria is ready to give up her impending marriage for him, send Giulio into a state chaos.

Cast and characters
 Alessandro Siani as Giulio Terracciano
 Elisabetta Canalis as Ilaria Fiorito
 Paolo Ruffini as  Filippo
 Marco Messeri as  Monsignor Guidoni
 Francesco Albanese as  Mario Saggiamo
 Sergio Solli as  Nicola Terracciano
 Enzo De Caro as  Alberto Ridolfi
 Fiorenza Marchegiani as  Marisa Terracciano
 Clara Bindi as  Clara
 Niccolò Senni as Giacomo Battistero

See also
 List of Italian films of 2008

References

External links
 

2008 romantic comedy films
2008 films
Films set in Naples
Films set in Tuscany
Italian romantic comedy films
2000s Italian films
2000s Italian-language films